The 1991 Houston Cougars football team represented the University of Houston as a member of the Southwest Conference (SWC) during the 1991 NCAA Division I-A football season. The Cougars were led by second-year head coach John Jenkins and played their home games at the Houston Astrodome in Houston, Texas. Houston compiled an overall record of 4–7 and a mark of 3–5 in conference play, placing seventh in the SWC.

Schedule

Source:

Roster

Game summaries

at Miami

Team players in the NFL

References

Houston
Houston Cougars football seasons
Houston Cougars football